Euthenarus is a genus of beetles in the family Carabidae, containing the following species:

 Euthenarus bicolor Moore, 1985
 Euthenarus brevicollis Bates, 1874
 Euthenarus brunneus Sloane, 1917
 Euthenarus comes Sloane, 1898
 Euthenarus morganensis (Blackburn, 1890)
 Euthenarus nigellus Sloane, 1902
 Euthenarus promptus (Erichson, 1842)
 Euthenarus puncticollis Bates, 1874

References

Harpalinae